George James Catlett (May 13, 1933 – November 12, 2014), known professionally as Buddy Catlett, was an American jazz multi-instrumentalist, best known for his work as a bassist.

Career 
Catlett was born in Long Beach, California, and raised in Seattle. A childhood friend of Quincy Jones, he played with Jones in bands led by Charlie Taylor and Bumps Blackwell. He attended Garfield High School.

Career 
In 1959, he was hired by Cal Tjader. He joined Jones's band for a European tour. He worked with Louis Armstrong, Bill Coleman, Curtis Fuller, Freddie Hubbard, Coleman Hawkins, Junior Mance, Chico Hamilton, Johnny Griffin and Eddie Lockjaw Davis.

Personal life
He died of heart problems and other illnesses on November 12, 2014, at age 81. He had been living at the Leon Sullivan Health Care Center in the Central District of Seattle.

Discography
As sideman
1959: The Great Wide World of Quincy Jones - Quincy Jones
1960: From Boogie to Funk – Bill Coleman 
1960: Big Brass - Benny Bailey
1960: Boss of the Soul-Stream Trombone - Curtis Fuller
1960: I Dig Dancers - Quincy Jones
1961: The Magnificent Trombone of Curtis Fuller - Curtis Fuller
1961: Rights of Swing - Phil Woods
1962: Goin' to the Meeting – Eddie "Lockjaw" Davis
1962: Tough Tenor Favorites - Eddie "Lockjaw" Davis
1962: On My Way & Shoutin' Again! - Count Basie
1963: This Time by Basie! - Count Basie
1963: More Hits of the 50's and 60's - Count Basie
1963: Ella and Basie! – Ella Fitzgerald and Count Basie
1964: Basie Land - Count Basie
1964: It Might As Well Be Swing - Frank Sinatra and Count Basie
1966: Wrapped Tight – Coleman Hawkins

References

External links
 

Place of birth missing
American jazz saxophonists
American male saxophonists
American jazz double-bassists
Male double-bassists
1933 births
2014 deaths
American male jazz musicians
20th-century American saxophonists